Carroll Creek is an  tributary of the Monocacy River in Frederick County, Maryland.  The headwaters of the creek are located on the eastern slopes of Catoctin Mountain, southeast of Gambrill State Park. The stream runs roughly east through the city of Frederick to the Monocacy, which drains to the Potomac River. The Shawnee Indians, who called the Monocacy River Monnockkesey (which translates as “river with many bends”), named Carroll Creek Walkwaki Methtegui, (which translates as "down in the gully creek").  

The creek was named after Charles Carroll of Carrollton, a former Marylander, and Frederick resident.

See also
List of Maryland rivers

References

External links
Carroll Creek Park - Flood control and restoration project, City of Frederick
Monocacy & Catoctin Watershed Alliance

Rivers of Frederick County, Maryland
Rivers of Maryland
Tributaries of the Monocacy River